Reuben Lalhruaizela (born 11 October 1990) is an Indian cricketer. He made his Twenty20 debut on 11 November 2019, for Mizoram in the 2019–20 Syed Mushtaq Ali Trophy.

References

External links
 

1990 births
Living people
Indian cricketers
Mizoram cricketers
Place of birth missing (living people)